Dela–Oenale (Western Rote, Delha, Oe Nale, Rote, Rote Barat, Roti) is an Austronesian language of Indonesia. Western Rote is a member of the Timor-Babar branch of Malayo-Polynesian languages spoken in west coast of Rote Island near Timor by about 7,000 people.

Alphabet 
Western Rote language has all 26 English letters (Aa, Bb, Cc, Dd, Ee, Ff, Gg, Hh, Ii, Jj, Kk, Ll, Mm, Nn, Oo, Pp, Qq, Rr, Ss, Tt, Uu, Vv, Ww, Xx, Yy, Zz), glottal stop, 5 diphthongs (gh, kh, mb, nd, ng, sy) and triphthong (ngg).

gh (replaced by g), kh (k), q (k), sy, v (f), x, and z (s) are only used in loanwords and foreign names.

References

External links 
 Alphabet and pronunciation

Timor–Babar languages
Languages of Indonesia